Carlia tutela is a species of skink in the genus Carlia. It is endemic to Indonesia.

References

Carlia
Reptiles described in 2004
Endemic fauna of Indonesia
Reptiles of Indonesia
Taxa named by George Robert Zug